For a related disambiguation page see Moyna

Majna is a village in Contai I CD block in Contai subdivision of Purba Medinipur district in the state of West Bengal, India.

Geography

Location

Urbanisation
93.55% of the population of Contai subdivision live in the rural areas. Only 6.45% of the population live in the urban areas and it is considerably behind Haldia subdivision in urbanization, where 20.81% of the population live in urban areas.

Note: The map alongside presents some of the notable locations in the subdivision. All places marked in the map are linked in the larger full screen map.

Demographics
As per 2011 Census of India Majna had a total population of 4,653 of which 2,358 (51%) were males and 2,295 (49%) were females. Population below 6 years was 602. The total number of literates in Majna was 3,272 (80.77% of the population over 6 years).

Transport
A short stretch of a local road links Majna to State Highway 5.

There is a station at Sitalpur, located nearby, on the Tamluk-Digha line.

Healthcare
Majna Block Primary Health Centre at Majna (with 15 beds) is the main medical facility in Contai I CD block. There are primary health centres at Kulberia (with 6 beds) and Nayaput (with 10 beds).

References

Villages in Purba Medinipur district